The Norwich Union Open was a professional invitational snooker tournament. The winner of both editions was John Spencer.

History 
The Norwich Union Open was a tournament open to both professionals and amateurs and featured 24 players in its first season. In the second year it featured just 16 players, but the prize money was increased. Both editions of the tournament were held at the Piccadilly Hotel in London.

Winners

Source

References

Snooker non-ranking competitions
Snooker competitions in England
Recurring sporting events established in 1973
Recurring events disestablished in 1974
1973 establishments in England
1974 disestablishments in England
Sport in London
Defunct snooker competitions
Defunct sports competitions in England